Proagoderus is a genus of Scarabaeidae or scarab beetles in the subfamily Scarabaeinae. It was considered a subgenus of Onthophagus by some authorities.  It includes over 100 species native to Africa and Asia.

References

External links

Scarabaeinae